ANO 2011, often shortened to simply ANO ("Yes" in English), the initials meaning Action of Dissatisfied Citizens, is a populist political party in the Czech Republic. The party was founded by Andrej Babiš. ANO has mainly been described as being centrist. It has also been placed as centre-left and centre-right on the political spectrum.

History

Foundation and coalition with ČSSD and KDU–ČSL (2011–2017)
The idea of founding a new political party came after leader and founder Andrej Babiš started talking about systemic corruption. ANO 2011 started as association in November 2011, and on 11 May 2012 ANO became an official political party in the Czech Republic.

In the legislative election held on 25–26 October 2013, ANO gained 18.7% of the vote and 47 seats in the Chamber of Deputies, attaining second place behind the Czech Social Democratic Party (ČSSD).

On 29 January 2014, the Cabinet of Social Democrat Prime Minister Bohuslav Sobotka was sworn in, with ANO and the Populars (KDU–ČSL) participating as junior coalition partners to the ČSSD.

On 24–25 May 2014, ANO came first nationally in the 2014 European election gaining 16.13% of votes and 4 seats, joining the Alliance of Liberals and Democrats for Europe (ALDE) group in European Parliament. On 10 September 2014, ANO member Věra Jourová was designated European Commissioner of Justice, Consumers and Gender Equality in the Juncker Commission.

In the 2014 senate and municipal elections held on 10–11 October 2014, ANO won 4 seats in the Senate. ANO was also the largest party in 8 of the 10 biggest cities in the Czech Republic including its capital, Prague. It took mayoral offices in three largest cities in the Czech republic (Prague, Brno and Ostrava). Adriana Krnáčová was the first female mayor of Prague. This success was later undermined when a large number of municipal coalitions broke up because of the party's disunity.

On 21 November 2014, ANO was given full membership of the Alliance of Liberals and Democrats for Europe (ALDE) at the ALDE congress in Lisbon.

In 2016, two parties split from ANO 2011 – Change for People and PRO 2016 (FOR 2016). The latter was joined by numerous local councilors and Mayors from ANO 2011. The new parties explained the split by citing a lack of democracy and discussion in ANO 2011. Andrej Babiš said that members of both parties left ANO 2011 because they weren't on candidate list for regional elections in 2016 but admitted that some members or organizations of ANO 2011 may have wanted to privatize their position in the party. Radka Paulová, leader of PRO 2016, defended herself that if she had really wanted a better position on Candidate list, she would have done better to have stayed in ANO 2011. Another member of PRO 2016 admitted that conflict about Candidature for Regional Councils also played a role. She said that the main criterion for candidates to regional councils was not professionalism but loyalty. ANO 2011 also lost one MP in July 2016 when Kristýna Zelienková left the party.

ANO won the 2016 regional elections and the first round of the 2016 senate election. The party came first in nine regions and second in the remaining four regions; its victory in South Bohemia was especially surprising. ANO ended up with 5 governors, one of whom, the Karlovy Vary Governor Jana Vildumetzová, became Chairman of Regional Association. The second round of the senate election was a disappointment to the party, as 3 candidates were elected.

On 11 October 2017, MEP Pavel Telička announced his departure from the party. Petr Ježek left ANO 2011 on 23 January 2018.

Minority government (2017–2021) 
On 20–21 October 2017, the ANO party won the 2017 legislative election with 29.6% of the vote. ANO formed the short-lived first Babiš government with independent ministers on 13 December 2017, failing a vote of confidence on 16 January 2018. On 12 July 2018 the second Babiš government was formed, with the ČSSD joining as the junior coalition partner to ANO. The cabinet received external support from Communist Party of Bohemia and Moravia.

In 2018 municipal elections the party again came first, but it lost mayorships of Prague and Brno to the ODS and the Czech Pirate Party.

In May 2019, ANO came first place in the 2019 European election, with 21.2% of the vote, returning 6 MEPs.

In 2020 regional elections, the party lost two governors' positions, but it joined various coalitions, which formed cordon sanitaire against the SPD and the KSČM.

Opposition (since 2021)
ANO participated in 2021 legislative election as a front-runner but finished second to Spolu. ANO still received highest number of seats. The party was delegated to opposition as Spolu formed coalition with Pirates and Mayors.

Babiš's Cafe 

Andrej Babiš started a project, Babiš's Cafe, in June 2016. It is the party's television program that consists of interviews with party leader Andrej Babiš. He is questioned by moderator Pavla Charvátová and also answers questions that are sent by viewers.

Ideology and political positions

Ideologically, the party is often placed in the political centre and has similarities with the Christian and Democratic Union – Czechoslovak People's Party (KDU–ČSL) and with Public Affairs. ANO's political position is debated among politicians and political scientists. Right-wing politicians and pundits place ANO 2011 on the left, while political scientists place it mostly in the centre. Babiš stated in an interview that ANO 2011 is "a right-wing party with social empathy". It has been also characterized as a syncretic and big tent/a catch-all party.

Andrej Babiš stated in a post-election interview that he opposes the Czech Republic's adoption of the euro, and that ANO opposes further European integration and "Brussels bureaucracy". Babiš stated later that he was open to adopting the euro once the Czech Republic had a balanced budget. He also pleaded for closer ties with Germany and said the Czech Republic was already ready to sign the Fiscal Compact treaty at the time of the interview. In some spheres, such as tax policy, Babiš reintroduced centre-left elements to the movement's politics, including the abolition of partial tax exemption for self-employed persons and restoration of the partial tax exemption for employed pensioners. He also introduced a proposal to increase school teacher wages by 2.5%, as opposed to his ministry's original proposal for a 1% increase. In the area of healthcare, Babiš has criticized public health insurance companies for their enormous spending.

ANO 2011 adopted Eurosceptic stances prior to the 2017 legislative election such as opposition to the Euro, deeper European integration and immigration quotas. The party took a more pro-EU stance after the campaign. Daniel Kaiser of Echo24 called the party's stance towards the EU "Euro-opportunism".

ANO is member of Alliance of Liberals and Democrats for Europe and Renew Europe which are mostly composed of liberal parties. ANO itself had been described as liberal, conservative-liberal, centre-right liberal, or liberal-populist. Additionally, ANO, or more specifically Babiš, has been compared to Silvio Berlusconi from Forza Italia or former President of the United States Donald Trump and opposes the economically liberal policies of the previous Civic Democratic Party-led governments.

After 2017 Czech parliamentary election ANO formed a minority government with support from Communist Party of Bohemia and Moravia ending the cordon sanitaire against them. Following the 2021 Czech parliamentary election, Euronews speculated that ANO 2011 may try to set itself up as a left-wing and populist opposition party, in order to absorb votes from the Czech Social Democratic Party, the KSČM and Přísaha, all of which remained outside of parliament for failing to cross the 5% threshold of the country's electoral system. KSČM also endorsed Andrej Babiš in the presidential election in 2023.

Structure
ANO 2011 has a highly centralised organisational structure. The strongest position is that of the Chairman who acts independently when representing the party. The highest body of ANO 2011 is its National Assembly that meets at least once in every two years. Other national offices include membership of the Party Committee and the Bureau. The Bureau is led by the Chairman. Regional assemblies can elect their own Chairmen; however, they must be approved by the Bureau before they can take office. The Bureau also approves all candidates for elections. Because of these reasons and considering Babiš's businesses, it can be described as a business-firm party.

The Institute for Politics and Society is a think-tank affiliated with ANO 2011. Its task is to raise new politicians for the party. Its founders also say that activity of the Institute should lead to nationwide discussion about national interests and also create space for politicians from a new generation.

Young ANO is the youth wing of ANO 2011. It was established in May 2015.

European representation 
ANO 2011 joined the Alliance of Liberals and Democrats for Europe group in June 2014, and Alliance of Liberals and Democrats for Europe Party in November 2014.

Currently in the European Parliament, ANO 2011 sits in the Renew Europe group with five MEPs.

In the European Committee of the Regions, ANO 2011 sits in the Renew Europe CoR group, with three full and one alternate members for the 2020–2025 mandate. Jaroslava Pokorna is an ex officio member of the Renew Europe CoR Bureau.

Election results

Chamber of Deputies

Senate

European Parliament

Regional elections

Local elections

Prague municipal elections

Presidential elections

References

External links
Official website

 
Political parties in the Czech Republic
2012 establishments in the Czech Republic
Political parties established in 2012